Daryl Werker (born 27 June 1994) is a Dutch professional footballer who plays as a centre-back for Eerste Divisie club ADO Den Haag.

Club career
On 18 August 2021, he returned to Roda JC on a one-year deal after having played one season for Greek club Xanthi.

Werker joined ADO Den Haag on 28 June 2022, signing a two-year contract with an option for an additional year.

References

External links
 
 

1994 births
People from Gulpen-Wittem
Footballers from Limburg (Netherlands)
Living people
Association football defenders
Dutch footballers
Roda JC Kerkrade players
MVV Maastricht players
Xanthi F.C. players
ADO Den Haag players
Eredivisie players
Eerste Divisie players
Super League Greece 2 players
Dutch expatriate footballers
Expatriate footballers in Greece
Dutch expatriate sportspeople in Greece